Carol Jarvis (born 17 November 1977) is a trombonist, keyboard player, arranger, musical director, professor, journalist, clinician and presenter.

Early life 
Jarvis was born in Northampton, England, and grew up in Newport Pagnell, Buckinghamshire, where her mother and father still live. She has an older brother. Jarvis attended Portfields School in Newport Pagnell, and secondary schools Ousedale in Newport Pagnell, Radcliffe in Wolverton, and Stantonbury Campus in Milton Keynes. Her early introductions to music were at the Stantonbury Music Centre, which was later renamed the Milton Keynes Music Centre.

Career 
She does a lot of session work and her playing features for soundtracks and films, commercials, jingles, and albums. Performances include freelance work with the likes of the London Symphony Orchestra, Hallé Orchestra and BBC Concert Orchestra, to working with Taylor Swift, Amy Winehouse, Bon Jovi, Ellie Goulding, Michael Bublé, Queen, Harry Connick Jr, Rod Stewart, and MUSE and touring and recording with the likes of Sting, Michael Bolton and six years on trombone, keys and backing vocals with Seal.

Her writing credits include orchestral arrangements for Seal, orchestral arrangements for the San Francisco Symphony Orchestra and she was assistant orchestrator for Corinne Bailey Rae's second and third critically acclaimed albums.

Jarvis is a Past-President of the British Trombone Society and is the Vice-President-elect of the International Trombone Association and President of the International Trombone Festival. She has been a professor of trombone at the Royal Northern College of Music in Manchester and Trinity Laban Conservatoire of Music in London since 2006 and has given many masterclasses and recitals across the world, from Mexico to Peru and Austria to Norway.

Health 
In October 2004 Jarvis was diagnosed with Hodgkin’s Lymphoma.

Awards 
 International Trombone Association - President's Award 2013
 Brass Herald - Brass Personality of the Year 2004
 Royal Over-Seas League Competition (Bones Apart Trombone Quartet) 2001
 Rio Tino Prize and Miller Trophy (Bones Apart Trombone Quartet) 2001
 Agnes D Bell Scholarship 2000
 Dorothy Lily Pope Scholarship 2000
 British Trombone Society/Jiggs Whigham Scholarship to study in America 1999
 Goronwy Evans Brass Prize (RNCM) 1998
 Sema Group Jazz Improvisation Award 1998
 Buckinghamshire County Music Scholarship 1990

Discography 
 Smile (2011) (proceeds go to Macmillan Cancer Support)

References 

Official Facebook Page
Michael Rath Trombones endorsed artist page
Official YouTube Channel
Milton Keynes Citizen Newspaper article
iBone iPhone application endorsed artist
Trombone Page of the World

External links 
 

British trombonists
1977 births
Living people
Alumni of the Royal Northern College of Music
People from Northampton
21st-century trombonists
Women trombonists